Wiang, Mueang Chiang Rai is a tambon (subdistrict) of Mueang Chiang Rai District, iChiang Rai Province, Thailand. In 2005 Wiang had a population of 12,430 people. It has five villages.

References

Tambon of Chiang Rai province
Populated places in Chiang Rai province